The National ITS Architecture is a guideline of the United States Government, for future transportation systems. It was established in 1994 by the United States Department of Transportation.  It was funded at a cost of $20 million.  The main goal was the definition of a standard national interoperable intelligent transportation system (ITS) structure.

External links 
 National ITS Architecture Home Page

Intelligent transportation systems